Elections to the French National Assembly were held in Niger on 10 November 1946 as part of the wider French elections. Previously Niger had formed a single constituency with neighbouring French Sudan, but the new 1946 constitution had separated the two territories, giving Niger one seat in the Assembly. It was won by Hamani Diori of the Nigerien Progressive Party – African Democratic Rally, who received 32% of the vote.

Results

References

Niger
1946 in Niger
1946 11